Pharus, the stalkgrasses, is a genus of Neotropical plants  in the grass family.

Species

Pharus ecuadoricus Judz. - Ecuador
Pharus lappulaceus Aubl. - Americas from Florida + San Luis Potosí to Uruguay
Pharus latifolius L. - Americas from Cuba + Veracruz to Bolivia
Pharus mezii Prodoehl - southern Mexico, Central America, Colombia, Venezuela, Ecuador
Pharus parvifolius Nash - southern Mexico, Central America, northern South America, West Indies
Pharus virescens Döll - Central America, northern South America
Pharus vittatus Lem. - Central America, Colombia

formerly included

see Hygroryza Leersia Leptaspis Scrotochloa 
Pharus aristatus - Hygroryza aristata
Pharus banksii - Leptaspis banksii 
Pharus ciliatus - Leersia hexandra
Pharus natans - Hygroryza aristata
Pharus urceolatus - Scrotochloa urceolata

References

 
Poaceae genera
Taxonomy articles created by Polbot